Batu is a federal constituency in the Federal Territories, Malaysia, that has been represented in the Dewan Rakyat since 1986.

The federal constituency was created in the 1984 redistribution and is mandated to return a single member to the Dewan Rakyat under the first past the post voting system.

Demographics 
吉隆坡国席 Kuala Lumpur - 马来西亚第15届全国大选 | 中國報

History

Polling districts
According to the gazette issued on 31 October 2022, the Batu constituency has a total of 23 polling districts.

Representation history

Local governments

Election results

References

Federal Territories of Malaysia federal constituencies